John Toole may refer to:
John Toole (artist) (1815–1860), Irish-American portrait painter
John Lawrence Toole (1832–1906), English comic actor
John Kennedy Toole (1937–1969), American novelist
John R. Toole (1849–1916), industrialist and legislator in Montana